Regina Kari (18 June 1892 – 24 May 1970) was a Finnish swimmer. She competed in the women's 100 metre freestyle event at the 1912 Summer Olympics.

References

External links
 

1892 births
1970 deaths
Finnish female freestyle swimmers
Olympic swimmers of Finland
Swimmers at the 1912 Summer Olympics
Sportspeople from Tampere